1-900 is a type premium rate telephone number, found in North America, using the pseudo area code "900"

1-900 may also refer to:

 1-900 (film), a 1994 Dutch film
 1-900 (record producer), a U.S. record producer, songwriter, musician

See also

 1900 (disambiguation)
 
 L-900, a Ford L series heavy duty truck
 Samsung Omnia SGH i-900 smartphone
 900 (disambiguation)